The green jay (Cyanocorax luxuosus) is a species of the New World jays, and is found in Central America. The basic diet consists of arthropods, vertebrates, seeds, and fruit. The nest is usually built in a thorny bush; the female incubates the clutch of three to five eggs. This is a common species of jay with a wide range and the International Union for Conservation of Nature has rated its conservation status as being of "least concern".

Taxonomy

Some ornithologists treat the green jay as conspecific with the Inca jay of the Andes, with C. yncas luxuosus as the green jay and C. yncas yncas as the Inca jay.

Description
They have feathers of yellowish-white with blue tips on the top of the head, cheeks and nape, though some taxa have more blue than others. The breast and underparts range from bright yellow in the south to pale green in the north (e.g., Texas). The upper parts are rich green. It has large nasal bristles that form a distinct tuft in some subspecies, but are less developed in others. The color of the iris ranges from dark brownish to bright yellow depending on the subspecies.

Behavior
Green jays feed on a wide range of insects and other invertebrates and various cereal grains. They take ebony (Ebenopsis spp.) seeds where these occur, and also any oak species' acorns, which they will cache. Meat and human scraps add to the diet when opportunity arises. Green jays have been observed using sticks as tools to extract insects from tree bark.

Breeding
Green jays usually build a nest in a tree or in a thorny bush or thicket, and the female lays three to five eggs. Only the female incubates, but both parents take care of the young.

Voice
As with most of the typical jays, this species has a very extensive voice repertoire. The bird's most common call makes a  sound, but many other unusual notes also occur. One of the most distinctive calls sounds like an alarm bell.

Distribution and habitat
The green jay occurs from southern Texas to Honduras. The similar Inca jay has a disjunct home range in the northern Andes of South America.

Status
The green jay is a common species throughout most of its wide range. It is an adaptable species and the population is thought to be increasing as clearing of forests is creating new areas of suitable habitat. No particular threats have been identified, and the International Union for Conservation of Nature has rated its conservation status as being of "least concern".

References

External links

 Green jay stamps from Belize and Venezuela at bird-stamps.org
 
 
 
 
 
 
 
 

green jay
Birds of the Rio Grande valleys
Birds of Mexico
Birds of Belize
Birds of the Yucatán Peninsula
Birds of the Northern Andes
Tool-using animals
green jay
Taxa named by René Lesson
Taxobox binomials not recognized by IUCN